The men's parallel bars competition at the 1936 Summer Olympics was held at the Waldbühne on 10 and 11 August. It was the sixth appearance of the event. There were 110 competitors from 14 nations, with each nation sending a team of up to 8 men. The event was won by Konrad Frey of Germany, the nation's first victory in the event since 1896 (and second overall, with Germany having the winning gymnast both times it competed). Germany also took the bronze, as Alfred Schwarzmann finished third. Second place and the silver medal went to Michael Reusch of Switzerland. Germany was the first nation to have two gymnasts win the parallel bars.

Background

This was the sixth appearance of the event, which is one of the five apparatus events held every time there were apparatus events at the Summer Olympics (no apparatus events were held in 1900, 1908, 1912, or 1920). Eight of the 15 gymnasts from 1932 returned: silver medalist István Pelle of Hungary, bronze medalist Heikki Savolainen of Finland, fourth-place finisher Mauri Nyberg-Noroma of Finland, sixth-place finisher Al Jochim of the United States, seventh-place finishers József Hegedűs and Miklós Péter of Hungary, tenth-place finisher Savino Guglielmetti of Italy, and eleventh-place finisher Frank Haubold of the United States. All but Guglielmetti had also competed in 1928. 1932 gold medalist Romeo Neri was competing in Berlin but did not contest the parallel bars. Switzerland had swept the podium at the 1934 world championships with Eugen Mack, Josef Walter, and Walter Bach.

Austria and Romania each made their debut in the men's parallel bars. The United States made its fifth appearance, most of any nation, having missed only the inaugural 1896 Games.

Competition format

The gymnastics format returned to the aggregation format used in 1928 but not in 1932. Each nation entered a team of eight gymnasts (Bulgaria had only 7). All entrants in the gymnastics competitions (Neri of Italy did not compete in the parallel bars) performed both a compulsory exercise and a voluntary exercise, with the scores summed to give a final total. The scores in the parallel bars were added to the other apparatus scores to give individual all-around scores; the top six individual scores on each team were summed to give a team all-around score. No separate finals were contested.

The compulsory exercise was described in the Official Report:

Schedule

Results

References

Men's parallel bars
1936
Men's 1936
Men's events at the 1936 Summer Olympics